Karadeniz is the Turkish name for the Black Sea, also used as a surname.

People
 Gökdeniz Karadeniz, Turkish football player
 Batuhan Karadeniz, Turkish football player
 Barış Karadeniz, Turkish politician

Other
 Karadeniz Energy, a Turkish energy company
 Karadeniz Ereğli, a city in Turkey
 Karadeniz Technical University, a university in Trabzon
 Karadeniz TV, a Turkish TV channel with a sister radio station, Karadeniz FM

 Turkish-language surnames